Waldo E. "Bill" Nelson (1898 – March 2, 1997) was an American pediatrician who was sometimes referred to as "the father of pediatrics". Nelson authored the leading  pediatric textbook (now known as the "Nelson Textbook of Pediatrics") and was a longtime editor of The Journal of Pediatrics. He led the pediatrics department at Temple University School of Medicine.

Biography
Waldo Nelson was born in McClure, Ohio in 1898. His father was a pharmacist. He graduated from Wittenberg College. Though his original plan had been to attend business school, the death of Nelson's baby sister inspired him to enter medicine. After working at Willys-Overland, Nelson received assistance from an executive at the automobile company and was able to go to medical school.

He graduated from University of Cincinnati Medical School in 1926. After completing an internship and residency in the same city, Nelson joined the staff of Cincinnati Children's Hospital in 1929. He left to work for the medical school at Temple in 1940, where he chaired the pediatrics department until 1964. He also spent time as medical director for St. Christopher's Hospital for Children in Philadelphia from 1947 to 1964.

Nelson was well known for the textbook that he authored for half a century, the Nelson Textbook of Pediatrics. Between 1959 and 1978, he also served as editor for The Journal of Pediatrics. The journal's circulation tripled during his tenure. Nelson practiced medicine into his eighties and continued to attend and speak at meetings in his nineties. He died of a stroke on March 2, 1997.

References

1898 births
1997 deaths
American pediatricians
Temple University faculty
University of Cincinnati College of Medicine alumni
Wittenberg University alumni
People from Henry County, Ohio